Mute R. Kelly (styled as #MuteRKelly) is a movement to have American singer R. Kelly convicted of sexual abuse and to end financial support for his career. The campaign was founded by Kenyette Barnes and Oronike Odeleye in July 2017, when Odeleye was informed Kelly was booked to perform at the Fulton County owned facility in Atlanta. Oronike stated, "Someone had to stand up for Black women, and if I wasn't willing to do my part — no matter how small — then I couldn't continue to complain. It's time for us to end this man's career. Enough is beyond enough."

Founding 
The co-founder of the movement in 2017, Oronike Odeleye, described the campaign: "#MuteRKelly continues until the Black community has fully financially divested from the man and his music and we tackle the overwhelming issue of sexual abuse". Odeleye is an African American Atlanta-based Arts Administrator and alongside her, Kenyette Barnes, activist and lobbyist, also sought to lobby elected officials, mobilize activists around the world encourage users of music streaming platforms to #ThumbItDown, when R. Kelly's music plays, in order to change the algorithm of his songs until they stop playing.

In addition, there are 12 chapters around the world including, #RKellyStummschalten in Germany and #MuteRKellyAmsterdam in Netherlands.

Allegations

Over two decades, R. Kelly has faced allegations of sexual abuse of minors, including marrying a 15-year-old girl (which was found to be factual), R&B singer Aaliyah, by listing her age as 18 on the marriage certificate that had falsified documents which supported the false age. The singer has also been sued and accused of supposed sex with an underage girl. On one count it is apparent Kelly videotaped one of these encounters. The singer then went on to face more charges of underage sex charges, child pornography charges and sex cult claims. The singer denies all of these allegations.

Impact

Protests

The Mute R. Kelly movement impact sparked many actions after being founded. The movement has seen a number of public protests in Chicago, Atlanta, Memphis, New York City, North Carolina, and more. Despite the protests, in some cities, Kelly still performed.

However, Kelly's scheduled performance was cancelled at the "Pre-Mother's Day Love Jam" at The University of Illinois at Chicago on May 5, 2018. A women's group at the university created a petition that secured 1300 signatures. Kelly, then posted a video on Twitter stated: "First of all, I want to apologize to all of my fans in Chicago, and basically all around the world wherever I'm performing at and they cancelled me," he then went on to say, "I don't know why they cancelled the show. I never heard of a show being cancelled because of rumors, but I guess there's a first time for everything. So, I apologize to you guys and in the meantime, I'm going to try to get to the bottom line of it, you know, as far as my lawyers are concerned, and see exactly what happened and why I was cancelled."

Celebrity attention

The movement has sparked some celebrity attention. Some of R. Kelly's music collaborations received backlash and have been removed from streaming services as the Surviving R. Kelly documentary series aired on Lifetime in January 2019 and the #MuteRKelly movement has grown. Artists such as Lady Gaga, Celine Dion and The Pussycat Dolls have apologised and taken down their respective collaborations with Kelly from streaming services. Despite this, Kelly has managed to later work with Bryson Tiller, Chance the Rapper, Justin Bieber, Erykah Badu and Mary J. Blige.

The Time's Up movement released an open letter calling out Apple, Spotify, Ticketmaster, Sony Music and other companies to end their financial relationship with R. Kelly.

The campaign has been cited and addressed online by celebrities including Ava DuVernay, Lena Waithe, Lupita Nyong'o, Ne-Yo, and Tarana Burke.

YouTube removed his 2 channels RKellyVevo and RKellyTV.

See also 
 Bill Cosby sexual assault cases
 Harvey Weinstein sexual abuse cases
 I Admit
 Me Too movement
Black women in American politics
Cancel culture

References

External links 

 Official website

2017 in Internet culture
2018 in Internet culture
2019 in Internet culture
Feminist organizations in the United States
Hashtags
Internet-based activism
Slogans
21st-century social movements
Sexual harassment in the United States
Sexual misconduct allegations
Violence against women in the United States
Obscenity controversies in music
R. Kelly
2017 neologisms